Farashband County is in Fars province, Iran. The capital of the county is the city of Farashband. At the 2006 census, the county's population was 38,679 in 8,474 households. The following census in 2011 counted 42,760 people in 10,706 households. At the 2016 census, the county's population was 45,459 in 12,604 households.

Administrative divisions

The population history and structural changes of Farashband County's administrative divisions over three consecutive censuses are shown in the following table. The latest census shows two districts, four rural districts, and three cities.

References

 

Counties of Fars Province